"Don't Call Me White" is a 7" single by NOFX featuring two songs from Punk in Drublic (1994). The record was limited to 1,500 copies on white vinyl. It is also the name of a song by NOFX. The two songs were directly taken from Punk in Drublic.
"Don't Call Me White"
"Punk Guy"

Meaning
When asked in a 1994 interview if the song is about reverse racism, Fat Mike responded saying, "Basically, I'm tired of all these correct terms you're supposed to be calling people now.

Cover versions
The Spanish punk band Avalots made a cover version of "Don't Call Me White" in Catalan called "No em digueu blanc".
The band Rancid also covered the song on the BYO Split Series Volume III.

References

1994 singles
NOFX songs
Skate punk songs
1994 songs
Epitaph Records singles
Protest songs
Songs against racism and xenophobia
Songs about white people